Calvi Cathedral (Pro-cathédrale Saint-Jean-Baptiste de Calvi) is a former Roman Catholic church located in Calvi on the island of Corsica, France. It was the episcopal seat of the Bishop of Sagona, which in 1801 was succeeded by the Bishopric of Ajaccio. The cathedral is a national monument.

Sources and external links
 Catholic Encyclopedia: Corsica
 Location

Cathedrals in Corsica
History of Corsica
Former cathedrals in France